Marshall Township is an inactive township in Platte County, in the U.S. state of Missouri.

Marshall Township was erected in 1839, and most likely has the name of Frederick Marshall, a local medical doctor.

References

Townships in Missouri
Townships in Platte County, Missouri